The Surat Metro is an under-construction rapid transit rail system for Surat in  Gujarat state of India. Two corridors with a combined length of 40.35 kilometers are under construction since 18 January 2021.

History
In August 2012, the Surat Municipal Corporation (SMC) proposed four rail routes for the metro project. The Government of Gujarat approved two corridors in January 2017.

The union government approved the project on 11 March 2019. It will be implemented by Gujarat Metro Rail Corporation Limited and it will be financed mainly through equity from Government of India and Government of Gujarat on 50:50 basis and loan from bilateral/ multilateral agencies. AFD has committed to lend 250 million euros for the project, which was signed on January 28, 2021. On 9 March 2019, the Public Investment Board (PIB) approved  for the project. On 17 December 2021, Germany Development Bank KfW and Government of India signed a €442.26 million loan pact towards the project.

In June 2020, the construction bids were invited for Phase-1.

The foundation of the project was laid on 18 January 2021 by Indian Prime Minister Narendra Modi. Construction is expected to complete by early 2024.

Route Network
The corridors are from Sarthana, Varachha to DREAM City() and from Bhesan Depot to Saroli. Sarthana-DREAM City corridor will have 20 stations and Bhesan - Saroli corridor will have 18 stations. Out of approved  corridor,  will be elevated, whereas  will be underground.

In Phase 1, 20 metro stations will be built on first corridor from Sarthana to DREAM City route and 18 metro stations will be built on second corridor from Bhesan to Saroli.

Line 1 (Sarthana - DREAM City)
Length: 21.61 km

Alignment: Elevated (15.14 km) & Underground (6.47 km)

No. of Stations: 20

Stations:
 Sarthana
 Nature Park
 Varachha Chopati Garden
 Shri Swaminarayan Mandir Kalakunj
 Kapodra
 Labheshwar Chowk
 Central Warehouse
 Surat Railway Station
 Maskati Hospital
 Gandhi Baug
 Kadarsha Ni Nal
 Majura Gate (Interchange to Line 2)
 Rupali Canal
 Althan Tenament
 Althan Gam
 VIP Road
 Woman ITI
 Bhimrad
 Convention Center
 DREAM City

Line 2 (Bhesan - Saroli)
Length: 18.74 km

Alignment:  Elevated

No. of Stations: 18

Stations:
 Bhesan
 Megh

 Botanical Garden
 Ugat Vaarigruh
 Palanpur Road
 LP Savani School
 Performing Art Centre
 Adajan Gam
 Jagdishchandra Bose Aquarium
 Badri Narayan Temple
 Athwa Chopati
 Majura Gate (Interchange to Line 1)
 Udhna Dawaja
 Kamela Darwaja
 Anjana Farm
 Model Town
 Magob
 Bharat Cancer Hospital
 Saroli

See also
Urban rail transit in India
Ahmedabad Metro
List of tourist attractions in Surat

References

Proposed rapid transit in India
Transport in Surat
Rail transport in Gujarat
Standard gauge railways in India